Pagi, or Bembi, is a Papuan language spoken by 2,000 people in five villages in Sandaun Province and in Vanimo District of Papua New Guinea, near the border with Indonesian Papua.

Overview
The name "Bewani" attributes to the mountains that form a boundary between Vanimo and Amanab Districts.

The Imbinis dialect of Pagi is spoken in Imbinis and Imbio villages.

Neighboring languages include Ainbai and Kilmeri, also Border languages belonging to the Bewani branch.

Usage
Pagi is spoken near Bewani Station, Idoli, and Amoi villages in Bewani-Wutung Onei Rural LLG. Tok Pisin is generally used by the government officials and in families where husband and wife belong to communities speaking different indigenous languages. The region is also influenced by English, which is the main language used in schools of the region, accompanied occasionally by Tok Pisin.

References

Border languages (New Guinea)
Languages of Sandaun Province